Kristian John Ayre (born November 19, 1977) is a Canadian actor, best known for his portrayal of the character Radu from the Nickelodeon children's science fiction show Space Cases.

Early life
Kristian Ayre was born in England, and moved to Canada at a young age. He began acting in the early 1990s, and appeared in the 1994 movie Andre with Keith Carradine. After a couple of appearances in TV Movies, including Bye Bye Birdie (1995), he was cast (thanks in part to co-creator Peter David) in the Nickelodeon TV series Space Cases as Radu 386.

He attended Simon Fraser University in Vancouver, British Columbia, graduating in 2004 with a Bachelor of Fine Arts degree in Theatre. He is trained in acrobatics and gymnastics.

Career
Ayre appeared in every episode of the David/Bill Mumy-created two-season Space Cases (1996–97), alongside co-stars Walter Emanuel Jones, Rahi Azizi, Paige Christina, Anik Matern, Cary Lawrence and Paul Boretski, which also featured early appearances from future-Firefly and Stargate: Atlantis actress Jewel Staite. Staite, as quoted by Peter David, described Ayre as:

Ayre starred in the 1997 CBS TV series The New Ghostwriter Mysteries, and in a regular role on the 1999–2000 TV series Nothing Too Good for a Cowboy alongside future-Scrubs star Sarah Chalke. In the 1999 movie Running Home, Ayre co-starred with Babylon 5 actress Claudia Christian, who is quoted as describing him as "a very good actor and very easy to work with." Ayre also has appeared in odd episodes of such notable science fiction shows as The Outer Limits, Stargate SG-1 and The Dead Zone, among other TV appearances. Appearing as 'Loran' in "The Light" (Stargate SG-1 Season 4, episode 18), Ayre was required to cry, but eschewed the usual tricks of the trade, since he can "cry on cue."

Ayre has also lent his voice to a number of dubbed versions of Japanese anime series, including Elemental Gelade, as the main character of Coud Van Giruet and Shinichiro Isumi in Hikaru no Go, as well as Yuji Sakai in the first season of Shakugan no Shana. His vocal talents have also been featured in the 1993 video release of Kishin Corps: Alien Defender Geo-Armor (orig. title: Kishin Heidan) and in the English-language version of the 2004 fourth InuYasha movie InuYasha the Movie: Fire on the Mystic Island (orig. title: Inuyasha - Guren no houraijima).

In addition to credits on both the big and small screen, Ayre has also appeared in stage productions, including MovEnt's "Dances for a Small Stage" XII in January 2006, and with the Genus Theatre in Vancouver. Also in 2006, he performed in "War Lover for the Vancouver International Folk Festival," which he also produced through his "work with the Leaky Heaven Circus."

A Lieutenant Kristian Ayre appeared as a bridge officer on the Enterprise-E in Peter David's 1997 Star Trek: New Frontier debut novel, House of Cards.

In 1998, Ayre appeared as Tommy McPherson in the mock-documentary Alien Abduction: Incident in Lake County, which depicted a rural family as they were besieged by bizarre unexplained occurrences, before being abducted by extraterrestrials. The program caused a level of confusion and controversy upon its initial broadcast that echoed earlier reality-muddying incidents such as Orson Welles' War of the Worlds radio broadcast. Debate over the hoax nature of the program occurred on Internet chat rooms and bulletin boards, where the program's status as fiction was established by virtue of the fact that Tommy McPherson was played by Ayre, an actor.

Personal life
Kristian Ayre has been married to his husband since 2021.

Partial filmography

References

External links

1977 births
Living people
Canadian male film actors
Canadian male television actors
Canadian male voice actors
English emigrants to Canada
English male film actors
English male television actors
English male voice actors
Naturalized citizens of Canada
People from Bolton
Simon Fraser University alumni
20th-century English male actors
21st-century English male actors
20th-century Canadian male actors
21st-century Canadian male actors
Canadian gay actors
LGBT male actors